Lorenzo Crisanto (born 20 April 1998) is an Italian football player.

Club career
He made several appearances on the bench for Roma in the 2016–17 season and was the first-choice goalkeeper for Roma's squad in the 2015–16 UEFA Youth League and 2016–17 UEFA Youth League.

He made his Serie C debut for Robur Siena on 5 May 2018 in a game against Prato.

On 17 January 2019, Crisanto joined to Monopoli on loan until 30 June 2019.

On 14 August 2019, he signed with Alessandria.

References

External links
 

1998 births
People from Prato
Sportspeople from the Province of Prato
Living people
Italian footballers
Association football goalkeepers
A.S. Roma players
A.C.N. Siena 1904 players
U.S. Pistoiese 1921 players
S.S. Monopoli 1966 players
U.S. Alessandria Calcio 1912 players
Serie C players
Footballers from Tuscany